Bhartiyam International school is a co-educational and senior secondary school, located in the locality at Rudrapur (near Nainital), India. BIS came into existence on 9 July 2012 under the founder chairmanship of Mr. Bharat Goel. At present the school imparts education up to class X on the C.B.S.E. pattern, English Medium co-education School affiliated to C.B.S.E. up to (10+2) with Science, Commerce & Humanities stream. It also offers integrated program for competitive entrance exam preparation from the expert teachers at school. Bhartiyam International School, has given good results regularly at different National and International Levels.

In 2021, Bhartiyam started its junior Wing Bhartiyam's Kids Planet in Model Colony, Rudrapur. The society took over a Pre-school in Rudrapur to expand its junior school footprint in the heart of the city. The junior school runs with Cmbridge Early Years curiculum and is one the best Early Childhood Care and Education centre in the State.

References

 Official Website of Bhartiyam International School, Rudrapur

High schools and secondary schools in Uttarakhand
International schools in India
Education in Udham Singh Nagar district
2012 establishments in Uttarakhand
Educational institutions established in 2012
Rudrapur, Uttarakhand